Montenegro competed at the 2022 European Athletics Championships in Munich, Germany, between 15 and 21 August 2022

Medallists

Results

Montenegro entered the following athletes.

Men 
 Field events

Women 
 Field events

References

External links
European Athletics Championships

Nations at the 2022 European Athletics Championships
European Championships in Athletics
2022